In enzymology, a galacturan 1,4-alpha-galacturonidase is an enzyme that catalyzes the chemical reaction

(1,4-alpha-D-galacturonide)n + H2O  (1,4-alpha-D-galacturonide)n-1 + D-galacturonate

Thus, the two substrates of this enzyme are (1,4-alpha-D-galacturonide)n and H2O, whereas its two products are (1,4-alpha-D-galacturonide)n-1 and D-galacturonate.

This enzyme belongs to the family of hydrolases, specifically those glycosidases that hydrolyse O- and S-glycosyl compounds.  The systematic name of this enzyme class is poly(1,4-alpha-D-galacturonide) galacturonohydrolase. Other names in common use include exopolygalacturonase, poly(galacturonate) hydrolase, exo-D-galacturonase, exo-D-galacturonanase, and exopoly-D-galacturonase.  This enzyme participates in pentose and glucuronate interconversions and starch and sucrose metabolism.

References

 

EC 3.2.1
Enzymes of unknown structure